Milanko Petrović (born 21 September 1988 in Sjenica) is a Serbian biathlete who participated at the 2010 Winter Olympics, becoming the first olympic biathlete for independent Serbia. At the 2014 Winter Olympics he carried Serbian flag at the opening ceremony and competed in biathlon and cross-country skiing. He represents Serbia at the Biathlon World Championships and he is a regular participant of the Biathlon World Cup and the first ever Serb to win World Cup points. Occasionally, he competes in cross-country skiing. At the 2013 Winter Universiade he made a remarkable success by winning first ever international medals for Serbia in biathlon and cross-country skiing.

Biathlon
Petrović competed 5 times at the Biathlon World Championships. His best achievements were 47th place in Pursuit and 49th place in Sprint achieved in 2013. The best finish in Individual was 87th place in 2011.

Milanko Petrović competed at the 2013 Summer Biathlon World Championship. He came 5th in pursuit and 9th in Sprint.

At the 2012 European Biathlon Championship, he finished 9th in sprint and 20th in Individual.
 In 2014 he won 8th place in sprint, 14th place in individual race and 15th in pursuit.

The biggest successes in his career so far, Petrović achieved in 2012/13 season of World Cup. At the 4th stage of World Cup in German, Oberhof, he finished 39th in 10 km Sprint and 40th in 12.5 km Pursuit. Those were his The best world cup results which brought him first world cup points. Petrović finished 35th in Pursuit in Oslo, during the 7th stage of World Cup and won new points. He finished 47th in Sochi in the 20 km Individual and 35th in 10 km Sprint, achieved the highest Individual and Sprint World Cup placements and also won new sprint points. Petrović finished 2012/13 season on 86th place overall scoring 15 points, in sprint he came 80th with 8 points and in pursuit he was ranked 72nd with 7 points.

Olympic Games

World Championships

World Cup

Cross-country skiing
Petrović competes for Serbian in cross-country skiing in Balkan Cup. He brought Serbia first ever wins in Balkan Cup in 10 km and 15 km Freestyle during the 2013 stage, held in Pale, Bosnia and Herzegovina. In 2013 he finished 8th in 10 km freestyle during the Austria Cup in Seefeld. At the 2013 Winter Universiade held in Trentino, Italy, Petrović won first ever international Serbian cross-country medal, gold in 10 km freestyle and achieved the best ever Serbian points 18.48 therefore Serbia managed to qualify for the first time two male athletes for the Olympic Games in cross-country skiing.

References

External links

 
 IBU profile

1988 births
Living people
People from Sjenica
Serbian male biathletes
Serbian male cross-country skiers
Olympic biathletes of Serbia
Olympic cross-country skiers of Serbia
Biathletes at the 2010 Winter Olympics
Biathletes at the 2014 Winter Olympics
Cross-country skiers at the 2014 Winter Olympics
Universiade medalists in biathlon
Universiade medalists in cross-country skiing
Universiade gold medalists for Serbia
Universiade bronze medalists for Serbia
Competitors at the 2013 Winter Universiade